Mikel Arguinarena (born 27 June 1991) is a Chilean footballer who plays for Magallanes as a midfielder.

References

1991 births
Living people
Chilean footballers
Chilean Primera División players
C.D. Huachipato footballers
Curicó Unido footballers
Association football midfielders